Darryl Ian Koshy (born 2 November 1988), better known by his stage name Dee Kosh, is a Filipino-born Singaporean former YouTuber, radio and internet personality, actor and singer, who has been convicted on sex offender charges.

Early life
Darryl Ian Koshy was born and raised in the Philippines to Singaporean parents, more specifically, a Chinese mother and an Indian father.

Career
In early 2012, Koshy auditioned to host "The Rude Awakening" on 987FM with Rosalyn Lee; the station hired him as the host of "Say It With Music" instead. In April 2013, he started hosting the weeknight "The Double D Show" on 987FM with Divian Nair. In 2014, Koshy left Mediacorp to join Power 98, a radio station run by SAFRA Radio, hosting the evening time belt. 

In late 2014, Koshy and Nair produced a web series on "the most random of topics", titled The Drive. Koshy contributed vocals to the COVID-19 pandemic-themed multilingual song "Stay Home", which was released in April 2020.

Sex crimes conviction
On 15 August 2020, an Instagram user accused Koshy of "[sexually harassing] me under the guise of recruiting me for his channel". At least five others subsequently came forward with similar accusations. The Straits Times reported on 19 August that six police reports had been filed against Koshy. Koshy initially denied all the allegations but later stated that "there is some truth to the things which are being said now" and apologised for his "questionable" tone, while maintaining that he did not solicit sexual favours from teenage males. 

In the days following the allegations, several companies reevaluated their relationships with Koshy. Production company Night Owl Cinematics suspended all projects involving him, while Huawei and Lenovo ended their sponsorship deals. Koshy has been "on leave" from Power 98FM since 17 August 2020. Koshy was charged with "sexual exploitation of a young person and making obscene films" on 19 August 2021. He posted $20,000 bail and a trial date was set for 15 September 2021.

His case was adjourned to March. He faces a sentence of up to two years for each charge of making payment offers for underage sex. He pleaded guilty to the charges on 30 May 2022.

On 3 August 2022, in their submissions, the prosecution sought a sentence of five to eight months' jail, citing that Dee Kosh's crimes, which were mainly and deliberately targetting the underaged, were "highly premeditated" and he did not show true remorse despite the aggravating nature of his crimes. The defence, however, seek a lower jail term of two-and-a-half months on the basis that he had low basis of re-offending and showed some regret for his actions. On 5 August 2022, he was convicted on the sexual offences involving minors and was sentenced to 32 weeks' jail.

Filmography

Films

References

20th-century Singaporean actors
Living people
Singaporean Internet celebrities
1988 births